Roberto Zuasnabar Machusso (born January 4, 1954) is a retired competitive judoka from Brazil, who represented his native country at the 1976 Summer Olympics in Montréal, Canada.

He twice claimed a medal at the Pan American Games, in 1975 and 1979. Machusso won the silver medal at the 1975 Pan American Games in the men's lightweight division (– 70 kg), after a loss in the final against Canada's Wayne Erdman.

References
 Profile

1954 births
Living people
Judoka at the 1976 Summer Olympics
Olympic judoka of Brazil
Place of birth missing (living people)
Brazilian male judoka
Pan American Games silver medalists for Brazil
Pan American Games bronze medalists for Brazil
Pan American Games medalists in judo
Judoka at the 1975 Pan American Games
Judoka at the 1979 Pan American Games
Medalists at the 1975 Pan American Games
Medalists at the 1979 Pan American Games
21st-century Brazilian people
20th-century Brazilian people